"I Tried" (also known as "I Tried (So Hard)") is a song recorded by Bone Thugs-n-Harmony, released in February 2007 as the lead single from their album Strength & Loyalty. This particular song features Layzie Bone, Krayzie Bone and Wish Bone. The song features and was produced by Akon; Giorgio Tuinfort assisted the artists in writing the song.

Background and composition
The song is about the struggles that the members of Bone Thugs-n-Harmony and Akon faced on the streets.

"I Tried" is performed in the key of G minor in common time with a tempo of 82 beats per minute.  The song follows a chord progression of Dm–E–F–Gm, and the vocals in the song span from F4 to E5.

Chart performance
The song entered the Billboard charts in the issue dated April 7, 2007.  It debuted at number eighty-two on the Billboard Hot 100 on the issue date April 14, 2007 and reached number six, making it the highest charting Bone Thugs-N-Harmony single in ten years.

Music video
On March 7, 2007, the music video officially debuted on Yahoo! and other websites. On December 31 of the same year, the video appeared at number 89 on BET's Notarized: Top 100 Videos of 2007 countdown. The video shows the group and Akon performing as well as tells the story of a young man in Cleveland where the group was first formed. The man walks into a grocery store, but at the entrance, he collides with a man running out of the store. The man drops what he had in his hand, revealing money. The money is inferred to be stolen from the store. The other man runs away, while the young man picks up his bag. Consequently, a police officer catches him picking up the bag where the money had been dropped. He runs from the police officer, but the officer eventually arrests him. The officer goes to the store to check with the owner if he had arrested the suspect. The store owner says the young man did not rob the store, and then the officer lets the young man go. The video ends with the man walking away from the store.

The music video was directed by Rich Newey.

Track listing

A-side
"I Tried" (featuring Akon)
Clean – 4:51
Dirty – 4:51
Instrumental – 4:51
A cappella – 4:33

B-side
"Bumps in the Trunk" (featuring Swizz Beatz)
Dirty – 4:25
Instrumental – 4:24
A cappella – 4:26

Charts

Weekly charts

Year-end charts

Certifications

References

External links
"I Tried" by Bone Thugs-N-Harmony explore the everyday struggles of young troubled males.
 Bone Thugs-n-Harmony featuring Akon "I Tried (So Hard)" music video on Gotuit Music
 "I Tried (So Hard)" music video

2007 singles
Akon songs
Bone Thugs-n-Harmony songs
Contemporary R&B ballads
Songs written by Akon
Song recordings produced by Akon
Songs written by Giorgio Tuinfort
2007 songs
Interscope Records singles
Songs written by Layzie Bone
Songs written by Wish Bone
Songs written by Krayzie Bone